This is a list of Estonian television related events from 1965.

Events
 1 May – the film studio Eesti Telefilm was established. The studio was led by Ülo Raudmägi.

Debuts

Television shows

Ending this year

Births

Deaths

See also
 1965 in Estonia

References

1960s in Estonian television